Kondukuduru is situated in East Godavari district in Ainavilli region, in Andhra Pradesh State.

References

Villages in East Godavari district